Mark K. Sargent (born July 20, 1969) is an American conspiracy theorist, who is one of the leading proponents of, and recruiters for, the flat Earth conspiracy theory in the United States. According to critics, his YouTube videos have greatly accelerated the popularization of modern flat-Earth belief, one without scientific merit.

Early life
He worked in information technology in Colorado, and relocated to Washington in 2015. As of 2021, he lives on Whidbey Island.

Sargent has been a competitive video game player, winning one virtual pinball tournament, and has worked as a software analyst, but has no scientific background.

Flat-Earth beliefs and influence

In 2015, Sargent released a series of videos he created on YouTube called Flat Earth Clues, which questioned the accepted shape of the Earth. The series attracted two million views, propelling the rise of the modern flat-Earth movement.

Sargent works to convince others that the Earth is a flat disk, with a giant wall of ice around the circumference. An indestructible dome is claimed to be attached to the rim, making it a closed system. He claims that stars and planets are not physical places but simply lights attached to the dome. Sargent alleges all world governments have been lying about the shape of the planet, and that NASA faked the Apollo program as well as all other space exploration programs.

An article in The New Yorker explained how Sargent's video series was instrumental in converting people to his viewpoint. It reported that Darryle Marble, who would later be a featured speaker at the first-ever Flat Earth Conference,

Sargent says that being single was a contributing factor to his discovering and believing in the flat-Earth conspiracy. He said, "Most people get married and have kids. But if you don't, you have a huge amount of free time on your hands." According to Sargent in an interview with the Los Angeles Times, as of 2018 his YouTube channel had accumulated ten million views and he had become a full-time YouTuber.

Sargent has been a speaker at numerous flat-Earth events in the United States, Canada and New Zealand. He describes himself as a recruiter for the movement, and has been called its main organizer by media including the Los Angeles Times. He was extensively interviewed for the 2018 documentary Behind the Curve, a Netflix documentary about the flat-Earth community. He also expounded on his views in a self-published book titled Flat Earth Clues: The Sky's The Limit in 2016.

Critics point out that the flat-Earth beliefs promoted by Sargent are pseudoscience: the theories and assertions are being based on beliefs rather than scientific knowledge. Experts classify them as a purposeful denial of reality called denialism.

Sargent also incorporates other conspiracy theories into his flat-Earth beliefs, accusing astronauts of being Freemasons. Sargent also believes Bigfoot exists.

Bibliography
 Flat Earth Clues: The Sky's The Limit (2016)
 Flat Earth Clues: End of The World (2019)

See also
 Figure of the Earth
 Geodesy
 Hollow Earth
 , documenting why the flat Earth belief is mistaken

References

External links
 Be Reasonable podcast: Episode #038 – Mark Sargent
 Brief illustrated interview of Sargent and his claim, from cartoonists Maki Naro and Matt Bors.

Flat Earth proponents
American conspiracy theorists
1960s births
Living people
People from Boulder, Colorado
Western Washington University alumni
American YouTubers